Capparis canescens, also known as wild orange, orangewood, native pomegranate, wild pomegranate or grey capparis, is a species of plant in the caper family. It is native to north-eastern Australia.

Description
The species grows as a shrub or small tree up to 4 m. The oval leaves are 4.5–10 cm long by 2.5–6 cm wide. The white flowers are 3 cm long, with the buds having four prominent ridges. The round fruits are 2.5–7.5 cm in diameter.

Distribution and habitat
The species is found mainly in eastern Queensland, extending into northern New South Wales. It occurs in open eucalypt forest.

References

 
canescens
Endemic flora of Australia
Flora of Queensland
Flora of New South Wales
Rosids of Australia
Plants described in 1824
Taxa named by Joseph Banks
Taxa named by Augustin Pyramus de Candolle